The Columbus mayoral election of 1971 was the 74th mayoral election in Columbus, Ohio.  It was held on Tuesday, November 2, 1971.  Incumbent Democratic mayor Jack Sensenbrenner was defeated by Republican party nominee Tom Moody.

Further reading

1971 Ohio elections
Mayoral elections in Columbus, Ohio
Columbus